Chord Busters is a Barbershop quartet that won the 1941 SPEBSQSA international competition.

Main Article on Barbershop wiki:
Chord Busters

References
AIC entry (archived)

Barbershop quartets
Barbershop Harmony Society